Tucha may refer to:
Tucha Range
Tucha, Iran